Alfred Pease may refer to:

 Alfred Pease (musician) (1838–1882), American musician
 Sir Alfred Pease, 2nd Baronet (1857–1939), British politician

See also
Alfred Pearse, cartoonist and campaigner